Lyu Qingwen (born 22 May 1998) is a Chinese handball player for Shandong Handball and the Chinese national team.

She represented China at the 2019 World Women's Handball Championship.

References

1998 births
Living people
Chinese female handball players